Yasoda tripunctata, the branded yamfly, is a species of blue butterfly (Lycaenidae) found in Asia.

Range
The butterfly occurs in India in the Himalayas from Sikkim right across to central Myanmar and the Naga Hills. The range extends south-eastwards to Thailand, Laos, northern Vietnam and southern Yunnan.

See also
List of butterflies of India (Lycaenidae)

Cited references

References
 
 
 
 
 

Yasoda (butterfly)
Butterflies of Asia